Dmitry Mikhaylovich Odinets (10 May 1950) was a Russian Empire politician and Ukrainian statesman.

In 1917-18 he was a minister of Great Russian Affairs in the Council of People's Ministers in Ukraine. In 1940s Odinets chaired the Union of Russian Patriots, a pro-Soviet organization of Russian émigrés in France. After Odinets was exiled to USSR along with other members of the Union, he settled in Kazan and taught Latin at the Kazan State University.

Bibliography
 Odinets, D. Out of the history of Ukrainian separatism

References

External links
 Dmitriy Odinets  at the Handbook on history of Ukraine

1883 births
1950 deaths
Politicians from Saint Petersburg
Historians from the Russian Empire
Trudoviks
National minority ministers of Ukraine
Saint Petersburg State University alumni
Academic staff of Kazan Federal University